In systems theory, closed-loop poles are the positions of the poles (or eigenvalues) of a closed-loop transfer function in the s-plane.  The open-loop transfer function is equal to the product of all transfer function blocks in the forward path in the block diagram.  The closed-loop transfer function is obtained by dividing the open-loop transfer function by the sum of one and the product of all transfer function blocks throughout the negative feedback loop.  The closed-loop transfer function may also be obtained by algebraic or block diagram manipulation.  Once the closed-loop transfer function is obtained for the system, the closed-loop poles are obtained by solving the characteristic equation.  The characteristic equation is nothing more than setting the denominator of the closed-loop transfer function to zero. 

In control theory there are two main methods of analyzing feedback systems: the transfer function (or frequency domain) method and the state space method.  When the transfer function method is used, attention is focused on the locations in the s-plane where the transfer function is undefined (the poles) or zero (the zeroes; see Zeroes and poles).  Two different transfer functions are of interest to the designer.  If the feedback loops in the system are opened (that is prevented from operating) one speaks of the open-loop transfer function, while if the feedback loops are operating normally one speaks of the closed-loop transfer function.  For more on the relationship between the two, see root-locus.

Closed-loop poles in control theory
The response of a  linear time-invariant system to any input can be derived from its impulse response and step response.  The eigenvalues of the system determine completely the natural response (unforced response).  In control theory, the response to any input is a combination of a transient response and steady-state response.  Therefore, a crucial design parameter is the location of the eigenvalues, or closed-loop poles.

In root-locus design, the gain K is usually parameterized. Each point on the locus satisfies the angle condition and magnitude condition and corresponds to a different value of K.  For negative feedback systems, the closed-loop poles move along the root-locus from the open-loop poles to the open-loop zeroes as the gain is increased.

Finding closed-loop poles
Consider a simple feedback system with controller , plant  and transfer function  in the feedback path. Note that a unity feedback system has  and the block is omitted. For this system, the open-loop transfer function is the product of the blocks in the forward path, . Therefore, the closed-loop transfer function is

 

The closed-loop poles, or eigenvalues, are obtained by solving the characteristic equation .  In general, the solution will be n complex numbers where n is the order of the characteristic polynomial.

The preceding is valid for single-input-single-output systems (SISO). In this case the poles are the solution of the equation

 

Classical control theory